The 2011–12 Highland Football League began on 30 July 2011 and ended on 16 May 2012.

The top two clubs at the end of the season, will receive direct entry to the second round of the 2012–13 Scottish Cup. The highest placed two clubs who have obtained an SFA club licence will qualify to enter the 2012–13 Scottish Challenge Cup.

The league was won by Forres Mechanics. It was their first title win since the 1985–86 season. Fort William finished bottom.

Table

Results

References

2011-12
5
Scot